Itamar Rosensweig is a rabbi and maggid shiur at Yeshiva University in New York City and a dayan (rabbinic judge) at the Beth Din of America, where he also serves as the editor of Jewishprudence: Thoughts on Jewish Law and Beth Din Jurisprudence.  Rabbi Rosensweig is also the resident scholar at Congregation Ahavath Torah in Englewood, NJ and teaches Jewish Business Law and Ethics at YU's Sy Syms School of Business. Previously, he taught an advanced Talmud shiur at Columbia University's Kraft Center, and presently serves as the maggid shiur at the University of Pennsylvania Hillel.

Education and Teaching
Itamar Rosensweig received his BA, with honors, in physics and philosophy from Yeshiva University, his MA in philosophy from Columbia University, and his Semikhah, Yoreh Yoreh and Yadin Yadin, from the Rabbi Isaac Elchanan Theological Seminary, where he was a fellow of the Wexner Kollel Elyon and Editor in Chief of the Beit Yitzchak Journal of Talmudic and Halakhic Studies. He also holds an MA in medieval Jewish history from the Bernard Revel Graduate School of Yeshiva University.

He studied Talmud closely with Rabbi Aharon Lichtenstein at Yeshivat Har Etzion and the history of Halakha with Professor Haym Soloveitchik at Yeshiva University. He is a close disciple of and studied for over a decade with his father, Rabbi Michael Rosensweig.     
He taught an advanced Talmud shiur at Columbia University's Kraft Center, a weekly chazarah shiur at the Rabbi Isaac Elchanan Theological Seminary, and served as the rabbinic scholar at Congregation Ahavath Torah in Englewood, NJ.

References

Living people
American Modern Orthodox rabbis
Rabbi Isaac Elchanan Theological Seminary semikhah recipients
Yeshiva University alumni
Yeshivat Har Etzion
21st-century American Jews
Year of birth missing (living people)